Edward Beveridge Binnie  (1884 in Stanley, Falkland Islands — 1956 in Sandefjord, Norway) was the second resident magistrate of South Georgia, serving from October 1914 to April 1927, during which time he resided at King Edward Point.

He had previously served as customs officer on East Falkland Island in 1907, in which position he supervised the activities of whaling companies

In 1912, Binnie became the first Resident Magistrate of Graham Land and the South Shetland Islands; in 1914, he was transferred to South Georgia.

In 1922, he officiated at the funeral of Ernest Shackleton.

In 1923, Binnie vacationed in Norway, where he met and married Margrethe Larsen; she came with him to the sub-Antarctic territories, but became homesick, and in 1927 he resigned his post so that they could move back to Norway.

The Binnie Peaks of South Georgia are named in his honor.

References

1884 births
1956 deaths
Falkland Islands people of Scottish descent
History of South Georgia
South Shetland Islands
People from Stanley, Falkland Islands
Scottish emigrants to Norway